The Thrissur Press Club (TPC) is an association of primarily news journalists and media professionals in the Thrissur City, Kerala, India. It is also the District Unit of Kerala Union of Working Journalist.

References

Press clubs
Mass media in Kerala
Organisations based in Thrissur
Indian journalism organisations
Organizations with year of establishment missing